The Red Rock Corridor is a proposed bus rapid transit transitway in the Twin Cities of Minneapolis and Saint Paul. The route connects the metropolitan area's southeastern suburbs to  downtown St. Paul, and through  it to downtown Minneapolis. The transitway would originate in Hastings with planned stops in Cottage Grove, Newport and Saint Paul. The route will terminate at Saint Paul's Union Depot. From Union Depot, riders will connect with express buses, local buses, and the Metro Green Line to Minneapolis, Minneapolis–Saint Paul International Airport, and the Mall of America.

Highway 61 is the principal arterial for the Red Rock Corridor and is in a primary corridor for rail, truck, and automobile travel. By 2030, an increase of 100,000 people is projected for the southeast metro. The majority of jobs, however, will continue to be located within Minneapolis and Saint Paul. Minnesota Department of Transportation anticipates heavy congestion along Highway 61 during the morning and evening commute periods by 2030.

The Red Rock Corridor Commission was established in 1998 as a joint powers board to address transportation needs for the corridor. The commission is made up of 11 members that represent the counties and communities along the transitway. Additionally, representatives from Goodhue County, the City of Red Wing, Prairie Island Indian Community, and the Canadian Pacific Railway serve as ex-officio members.

The Red Rock Corridor Commission originally selected commuter rail as the mode for the Red Rock Corridor. In 2007, the commission determined that expanding service through a phased approach would help build demand for transit. The preferred mode of operation was updated to bus rapid transit during the Alternatives Analysis Update completed in 2014. The Red Rock Corridor Commission completed an implementation plan in 2016 focused on a phased approach to bring BRT to the southeast metro area. Strategies include improving local bus service in the near term and implementing BRT in the long term. The Red Rock Corridor Commission adopted the Implementation Plan on October 26, 2016.

References

External links
 Red Rock Corridor Transitway web site
 Red Rock Corridor Route Map

Transportation in Minneapolis–Saint Paul
Transportation in Washington County, Minnesota
Proposed bus rapid transit in the United States
Proposed public transportation in Minnesota
Bus rapid transit in Minnesota
Metro Transit (Minnesota)